Bradley Locko Banzouzi (born 6 May 2002) is a French professional footballer who plays as a left-back for  club Brest on loan from Reims.

Career 
Bradley Locko was born in Ivry-sur-Seine and went through several football academies in Paris suburbs, including CA Vitry and US Ivry, before spending some years in Montrouge, from where he joined FC Lorient in 2019.

Bradley signed his first professional contract with Reims in June 2020, spending his first year in Champagne with the National 2 reserve team.

He made his professional debut for Stade de Reims on the 15 August 2021, starting the Ligue 1 3–3 home draw against Montpelier as a left-back. His performance was viewed as promising one, among a fairly young Reims team, with the likes of Ilan Kebbal and Hugo Ékitiké.

On 31 January 2023, Locko joined Brest on loan with an option to buy.

Personal life
Born in France, Locko is of Congolese descent. His twin brother, Bryan Locko, is also a footballer who was with him in the academy of Lorient.

References

External links
 
 Stade de Reims profile
 

2002 births
Living people
People from Ivry-sur-Seine
French sportspeople of Republic of the Congo descent
French footballers
Association football defenders
Twin sportspeople
French twins
Stade de Reims players
Stade Brestois 29 players
Ligue 1 players
Championnat National 2 players
Black French sportspeople